Sargeant is a surname. It may refer to:

Bob Sargeant (1947–2021), British musician and record producer. 
Carl Sargeant (1968-2017), Welsh politician
Harry Sargeant III (1957), American businessman
Howland H. Sargeant (1911–1984), United States Assistant Secretary of State for Public Affairs in 1952–53
Logan Sargeant (born 2000), American racing driver
Roy Sargeant, South African filmmaker and playwright, adapted the novel Cry, the Beloved Country for stage in 2003

English-language surnames
Occupational surnames
English-language occupational surnames